Lawrence Goldtree Blochman (February 17, 1900 – January 22, 1975) was an American detective story writer and translator.

Lawrence Blochman was born in San Diego, California, to Lucien A. Blochman, a banker, and his wife Haidee Goldtree. He began writing early. As a junior at San Diego High School, Blochman reported school sports for the San Diego Evening Tribune and, as a senior, he replaced the Tribune sports editor who had left to serve in World War I. Blochman then attended the University of California, Berkeley where he edited the college newspaper, the Daily Californian. In the summer he served as a police reporter for the Tribune and a courthouse reporter for the San Diego Sun. He graduated from college in 1921.

After graduation, he tried to write his "way around the world," working in Tokyo for the Japan Advertiser, in Hong Kong for the South China Morning Post, in Shanghai for the Far Eastern Review, in Calcutta for The Englishman, and in Paris for the Chicago Tribune. He returned to San Diego as city editor of the Sun in 1924. In 1926, he married Marguerite Maillard in Paris.

Writing as Lawrence G. Blochman, he published more than 50 books, including many mystery and detective novels, as well as several hundred short stories, novelettes, and articles. Several of his stories were made into films, television programs, and radio shows. He also translated more than a dozen books and detective stories from the French, including novels by the celebrated Belgian writer Georges Simenon.

In 1948, Blochman served as the fourth president of the Mystery Writers of America, following Baynard Kendrick, Ellery Queen, and Hugh Pentecost. In 1951, Blochman's "Diagnosis: Homicide" received an Edgar Award in the Best Short Story category. He was vice president of the Overseas Press Club and winner of its Meritorious Service Award in 1959. He died in New York City in 1975. His widow Marguerite died there in 1991. Blochman's family was of French Jewish origin and was among the pioneers in San Diego.

Bibliography
Bombay Mail (1934)
Bengal Fire (1937)
Red Snow at Darjeeling (1938)
Midnight Sailing (1939)
Blow Down (1940)
Wives to Burn (1940)
See You at the Morgue (1946)
Diagnosis: Homicide (1950)
Death Walks in Marble Halls aka Murder Walks in Marble Halls (1951)
Pursuit (1951)
Rather Cool for Mayhem (1952)
Recipe for Homicide (1952)
Clues for Dr. Coffee (1964)

External links and sources
"The Blochman Saga in San Diego" by Trudie Casper in the Journal of San Diego History, Winter 1977, Volume 23, Number 1

1900 births
1975 deaths
American mystery writers
20th-century American novelists
20th-century American male writers
Edgar Award winners
University of California, Berkeley alumni
American editors
20th-century American translators
American male novelists
American male short story writers
20th-century American short story writers
San Diego High School alumni